Nordyke is a surname. Notable people with the surname include:

 Addison H. Nordyke, American industrialist
 David Nordyke (1952–2003), American educator
 Deborah Nordyke (born 1962), American biathlete
 Lou Nordyke (1876–1945), American baseballer
 Micajah Thomas Nordyke (1847–1919), American painter
Phil Nordyke (1952- ), American historian and author.

See also
 Nevada State Route 339, aka Nordyke Road
 Nordyke v. King, American lawsuit
 Nordyke Marmon & Company, American company